Matty Roberts may refer to:
a member of Blaggers ITA
the creator of Storm Area 51

See also
Matt Roberts, an English television presenter